ONE Fight Night 9: Nong-O vs. Haggerty is an upcoming combat sports event produced by ONE Championship that will take place on April 29, 2023, at Lumpinee Boxing Stadium in Bangkok, Thailand.

Background 
A ONE Bantamweight Muay Thai World Championship bout between current champion Nong-O Gaiyanghadao and former ONE Flyweight Muay Thai World Champion Jonathan Haggerty is expected to headline the event.

A strawweight bout between Bokang Masunyane and Hiroba Minowa is expected to take place at the event. The pairing was previously scheduled to meet at ONE 159, but the bout was scrapped due to Masunyane missed weight and Minowa rejecting a catchweight bout.

A bantamweight bout between Jhanlo Mark Sangiao and Matias Farinelli is expected to take place at the event. The pairing was previously scheduled to meet at ONE 164, but Farinelli has been removed from the card due to tested positive for COVID-19.

Fight card

See also 

 2023 in ONE Championship
 List of ONE Championship events
 List of current ONE fighters

References 

Events in Bangkok
ONE Championship events
2023 in mixed martial arts
Mixed martial arts in Thailand
Sports competitions in Thailand
April 2023 sports events in Asia
Scheduled mixed martial arts events